Gabriel von Seidl (9 December 1848 – 27 April 1913) was a German architect and a representative of the historicist style of architecture.

Life and work 
Gabriel Seidl was born in Munich, Bavaria in 1848. He was the first son of the wealthy baker Anton Seidl and his wife Therese, daughter of the well-known brewer Gabriel Sedlmayr.  Seidl initially studied mechanical engineering at the Polytechnic School in Munich. He worked as a mechanical engineer in England, where he found that his real talent lay in the field of architecture. Consequently, he began studying at the Academy of Fine Arts in Munich. His studies were interrupted during 1870–1871 due to his volunteer participation in the Franco-Prussian War. After an extended period of study in Rome, he opened an interior decoration studio in 1878.

Seidl was a member of the Bavarian Arts and Crafts Association founded in 1851 and quickly won the admiration of its members, including Lorenz Gedon, Rudolf von Seitz, and Fritz von Miller. In 1900 Gabriel Seidl was awarded the Verdienstorden der Bayerischen Krone ("Order of Merit of the Bavarian Crown"). Thereby he was raised to the peerage and became Ritter von Seidl. In 1908 he was awarded the Pour le mérite für Wissenschaften und Künste ("Knight of the Order Pour le Mérite for Sciences and Arts").  In 1902 he founded the Isartalverein, an association for the preservation of the natural beauty of the Isar valley, at the Artists' House in Munich. The Isartalverein was founded  in order to prevent further destruction of the Isar valley by building speculators after the establishment of the first power plants in that area by the electric power company Isarwerke GmbH.

Seidl was made an honorary citizen of Speyer on 14 April 1909 because of his construction of a new building for the Historical Museum of the Palatinate in Speyer. In 1913 he was made an honorary citizen of Munich.

From 1866, Seidl, like his cousin Gabriel Ritter von Sedlmayr, was a member of the Corps Germania Munich. Not only was he a faithful corps brother till his death, he also drew the plans for the construction of the corps house, overseeing the progress of the work personally.

In 1890 Seidl married Franziska Neunzert, the daughter of a forester. Five children were born of this marriage. Seidl died in 1913 in his residential and office building at 28 Mars Road in Munich.

Gabriel von Seidl's brother Emanuel von Seidl was also an architect, but because his work focused mainly on private residential buildings, he is not as well known today.

Gabriel von Seidl is buried at the Old South Cemetery in Munich.

Honors 
 Honorary curator of the Bavarian National Museum
 Honorary member of the Academy of Fine Arts, Munich
 Royal Bavarian professor
 Honorary doctorate from the Technical University of Munich
 Honorary Citizen of the City of Munich
 Honorary citizen of the city of Speyer
 Honorary citizen of the town of Bad Tölz

Gabriel von Seidl is the namesake of the Gabriel-von-Seidl-Gymnasium in Bad Tölz. Streets or squares are named after him in Bremen, Gräfelfing, Grünwald, Nuremberg, Pullach, and Worms. The Isartalverein erected a commemorative pillar in his memory in Pullach in 1922.

Selected works

References

Sources 
 Stephan Bammer, Architekt, Natur- und Heimatschützer. Zum 100. Todestag von Gabriel von Seidl. ("Architect, and nature and heritage protector. On the 100th anniversary of the death of Gabriel von Seidl") In Schönere Heimat ("Nicer Home"), 102, p. 4–12, 2013.
 Hans Bössl, Gabriel von Seidl, Verlag des Historischen Vereins von Oberbayern ("Publisher of the Historical Society of Upper Bavaria"), Munich, 1966.
 Hans Herpich, Monumenta Germaniae, Gedenkblätter zum 100. Bundesfest des Corps Germania zu München ("Monumenta Germaniae: Commemoration of the 100th Corps Festival of the Corps Germania Munich"), Ingolstadt, 1963.
 Veronika Hofer (Ed.), Gabriel von Seidl. Architekt und Naturschützer. ("Gabriel von Seidl: Architect and conservationist"), Hugendubel Verlag, Munich, 2002. 
 Wilhelm Neu, Volker Liedke, Otto Braasch: Denkmäler in Bayern ("Monuments in Bavaria"), Oldenbourg Wissenschaftsverlag, 1986.

Documentary movies 
 Gabriel von Seidl. Ein Architekt prägt München. ("Gabriel von Seidl: An architect shapes Munich").  TV documentary by Bernhard Graf, Germany 2004, BR, 45 minutes.
 Gabriel von Seidl. Architekt des bayerischen Heimatstils. ("Gabriel von Seidl: Architect of the Bavarian homeland style").  TV documentary by Bernhard Graf, Germany 2004, BR, 45 minutes.

External links 

 
 
 Homepage of Gabriel-von-Seidl-Gymnasiums in Bad Tölz

1848 births
1913 deaths
19th-century German architects
German conservationists
Historicist architects
Architects from Munich
Technical University of Munich alumni
Recipients of the Pour le Mérite (civil class)